The 2007 Estoril Open was a combined men's and women's tennis tournament played on outdoor clay courts. It was the 18th edition of the Estoril Open for the men (the 11th for the women), and was part of the International Series of the 2007 ATP Tour, and of the Tier IV Series of the 2007 WTA Tour. Both the men's and the women's events took place at the Estádio Nacional in Oeiras, Portugal, from 30 April through 6 May 2007.

Finals

Men's singles

 Novak Djokovic defeated  Richard Gasquet, 7–6(9–7), 0–6, 6–1

Women's singles

 Gréta Arn defeated  Victoria Azarenka, 2–6, 6–1, 7–6(7–3)

Men's doubles

 Marcelo Melo /  André Sá defeated  Martín García /  Sebastián Prieto, 3–6, 6–2, [10–6]

Women's doubles

 Andreea Ehritt-Vanc /  Anastasia Rodionova defeated  Lourdes Domínguez Lino /  Arantxa Parra Santonja, 6–3, 6–2

External links
Official website
Men's Singles draw
Men's Doubles draw
Men's Qualifying Singles draw
Women's Singles, Doubles and Qualifying Singles draws